Korpsführer was a Nazi Party paramilitary rank that was the highest rank used by the National Socialist Motor Corps and the National Socialist Flyers Corps.  Translated as "Corps Leader", the rank of Korpsführer was held by the single officer in command of the entire organization.  The rank was the equivalent of Reichsführer-SS, at least on paper.

List of Korpsführers

NSFK

NSKK

References

Notes

Bibliography
 
 
 
 

Nazi paramilitary ranks